The Albarine is a  long river in the Ain department in Eastern France. Its source is at Brénod. It flows generally southwest.

Communes along its course
This list is ordered from source to mouth: 
Ain: Brénod, Corcelles, Champdor, Hauteville-Lompnes, Chaley, Tenay, Argis, Oncieu, Saint-Rambert-en-Bugey, Torcieu, Bettant, Ambérieu-en-Bugey, Saint-Denis-en-Bugey, Château-Gaillard, Leyment, Saint-Maurice-de-Rémens, Châtillon-la-Palud

References

Rivers of France
Rivers of Auvergne-Rhône-Alpes
Rivers of Ain